The Best of Branigan was the first greatest hits compilation by singer Laura Branigan to be released in the United States.  The 1995 anthology collection also marked the end of Branigan's relationship with her record label, Atlantic Records.  Of the thirteen tracks, eight had charted, including her major hit singles "Gloria", "Solitaire", "Self Control", "Power of Love", and "How Am I Supposed to Live Without You".

The album features two new recordings: "Show Me Heaven" and a cover of Donna Summer's "Dim All the Lights", the latter which was released as a single in late spring 1995 and became a Billboard Top 40 Dance hit. Remaining tracks were taken from her 1993 album Over My Heart, which had been largely overlooked by audiences.

In terms of her global music releases, Best of Branigan had already been preceded by other greatest hits anthologies outside the United States, all with very similar titles, beginning in 1988, and again in 1992, for listeners in much of the rest of the world.

Prior to its April 2007 re-release on Rhino Records, the compilation had sold 147,000 copies in the U.S.

Critical reception 
The compilation album was well received by many music critics. Chuck Eddy from Entertainment Weekly gave it an A, writing, "Laura Branigan’s voice was as titanic as any ’80s pop star’s. There was animal in her howl and opera in her high notes. Her biggest hits, collected on The Best of Branigan, told about women heading for mental breakdowns. ”Spanish Eddie”, a disco-flamenco about a night when a friend’s death leads to insanity, wasn’t a hit; it should’ve been."

Track listing

References 

1995 greatest hits albums
Laura Branigan albums
Atlantic Records compilation albums